A hidden object game, also called hidden picture or hidden object puzzle adventure (HOPA), is a puzzle video game genre in which the player must find items from a list that are hidden within a scene. Hidden object games are a popular trend in casual gaming. Time-limited trial versions of these games are usually available for download, although many are free to download on app stores. Popular themes include detective crime stories, adventure, gothic romance and mystery.

Definition
In a hidden object game, the player wanders from one place to another to discover objects that allow the player to finish the game. The player adds objects to their inventory. A hidden object puzzle within the game provides more objects or clues that will assist the playing in completing the game. 

Hidden objects generally tend to feature: 
 Courageous, adventurous female protagonists
 Characters who need to be rescued from something and have relations to the main protagonist
 Fantasy themes with supernatural elements and themes of romantic horror
 Visuals of hand-painted 2D art that can be playable even on weak personal computers

History
Hidden object games originated in print publications such as the I Spy books or a regular feature in Highlights for Children, in which the reader was given a list of objects to find hidden in a cluttered illustration or photograph. An early hidden object game was Mother Goose: Hidden Pictures, released for the CD-i in 1991. Other early incarnations are the video game adaptations of the I Spy books published by Scholastic Corporation since 1997. 

Mystery Case Files: Huntsville, released by Big Fish Games in 2005, came at the rise of casual gaming in the mid-2000s. Mystery Case Files: Huntsville established many of the principles in both game play and narrative that would be predominate in hidden object games since. 

More recently within indie games, new takes on the hidden object genre have changed the approach these take. For example, Hidden Folks is considered more of a searching game, as to find one character among hundreds on the screen that look similar to each other, similar to Where's Wally.

Popularity
Huntsville broke prior sales of casual games, and the series' third iteration Mystery Case Files: Ravenhearst was the third best-selling game on personal computers during the end-of-year sales period of 2007. This motivated gaming companies to expend in this sort of storytelling that focuses on still puzzles with little animation.

Hidden object games draw players who were fans of games like Myst, and player demographics skew toward women who are over 55 years of age . In 2021, Big Fish Games' player base was 85% female, 76% of whom were over the age of 55.

See also
 Hidden picture book

References

Video game genres